The 2020 Russian Grand Prix (officially known as the Formula 1 VTB Russian Grand Prix 2020) was a Formula One motor race held on 27 September 2020 at the Sochi Autodrom in Sochi, Russia. The race was the tenth round of the 2020 Formula One World Championship, ninth running of the Russian Grand Prix and the seventh time held in Sochi. The 53-lap race was won by Valtteri Bottas of the Mercedes team, with Max Verstappen of Red Bull placing 2nd, and Lewis Hamilton taking the final podium place.

Background

Impact of the COVID-19 pandemic

The 2020 championship was heavily affected by the COVID-19 pandemic. Most of the originally planned Grands Prix were cancelled or postponed, prompting the Fédération Internationale de l'Automobile to draft a new calendar. However, the Russian Grand Prix kept its original date. Up to 30,000 fans were expected to attend the race with social distancing measures in place. Haas driver Romain Grosjean expressed discomfort over the handling of the pandemic situation at his hotel.

Entrants

Ten teams (each representing a different constructor) each entered two drivers. The drivers and teams were the same as those on the season entry list with no additional stand-in drivers for either the race or practice.

Tyres 

Sole Formula One tyre manufacturer Pirelli supplied their C3, C4 and C5 compound tyres for teams to use in the race, the three softest compounds available.

Practice 
The first free practice session ended with Mercedes driver Valtteri Bottas quickest, followed by Daniel Ricciardo of Renault and Max Verstappen of Red Bull. The session was disrupted first by McLaren driver Carlos Sainz Jr.'s spin in turn seven, which caused damage to his rear wing and triggered a virtual safety car. Nicholas Latifi of Williams spun in turn ten causing severe damage to his car and triggering another red flag.

The second practice session ended with Bottas ahead of teammate Lewis Hamilton and Ricciardo. The third practice session ended with Hamilton fastest ahead of Bottas and Sainz Jr.

Qualifying 
Hamilton took pole, 0.563s ahead of Red Bull’s Max Verstappen. Valtteri Bottas finished 3rd with Sergio Pérez in 4th for Racing Point. Renault’s Daniel Ricciardo qualified 5th followed by Carlos Sainz Jr., Esteban Ocon, Lando Norris, Pierre Gasly and Alexander Albon.

Out in Q1 (the first part of qualifying) were Romain Grosjean, Antonio Giovinazzi, Kevin Magnussen, Nicholas Latifi and Kimi Räikkönen. In Q2, Charles Leclerc finished 11th, missing out on Q3 after his teammate Sebastian Vettel crashed, bringing out the red flag and Hamilton making it to the line to set his final lap in Q2 seconds before the chequered flag came out to end the session. Daniil Kvyat was 12th followed by Lance Stroll, whose engine overheated preventing him from going out for a second run in Q2, Williams driver George Russell and Vettel.

Qualifying classification 

  – Alexander Albon and Nicholas Latifi both received a five-place grid penalty for an unscheduled gearbox change.

Race 
Kimi Räikkönen started his 322nd Grand Prix, tying Rubens Barrichello's record. Carlos Sainz Jr. took to the run off area and hit the wall trying to rejoin the circuit at the race start. Charles Leclerc collided with Lance Stroll causing the latter to hit a wall. The safety car was sent out to clear the debris at the second turn.

Lewis Hamilton was handed down two 5-second penalties for doing practice starts outside the designated areas, which he served on his first pitstop. Hamilton was also initially given two penalty points on his FIA Super Licence which would have left him on 10 penalty points for the last 12 months period, only two penalty points short of a race ban. However, these penalty points were rescinded after stewards received information that team radio communications had advised Hamilton about where he could or could not do a practice start and the team was fined instead for their error. Both Daniel Ricciardo and Alexander Albon were given a 5-second penalty for exceeding the track limits at turn 2.

The race was won by Valtteri Bottas ahead of Max Verstappen and Hamilton. The result left Hamilton leading the championship with 205 points from teammate Bottas on 161 points.

Race classification 

 Notes

  – Includes one point for fastest lap.
  – Daniel Ricciardo and Alexander Albon both received a five-second time penalty for failing to follow the race director's instructions at turn 2.

Championship standings after the race

Drivers' Championship standings

Constructors' Championship standings

 Note: Only the top five positions are included for both sets of standings.

See also 
 2020 Sochi Formula 2 round

Notes

References 

 

Russian Grand Prix
Russia
Russian Grand Prix
Russian Grand Prix